NHPC Limited  (erstwhile  National Hydroelectric Power Corporation )  is an Indian government hydropower board under the ownership of Ministry of Power, Government of India  that was incorporated in the year 1975 with an authorised capital of ₹2,000 million and with an objective to plan, promote and organise an integrated and efficient development of hydroelectric power in all aspects. Recently it has  expanded to include other sources of energy like Solar, Geothermal, Tidal, Wind etc.

At present, NHPC is a Mini Ratna Category-I Enterprise of the Govt. of India with an authorised share capital of ₹ Million . With an investment base of over ₹ Million Approx., NHPC is among the top ten companies in the country in terms of investment. Baira Suil Power station in [Salooni] Tehsil of Chamba district was the first project undertaken by NHPC.

On 7 September 2022, the world's largest institutional investor the Norwegian Government Pension Fund Global divested from NHPC due to “unacceptable risk that NHPC contribute to severe environmental damage".

Public Limited Company 
NHPC is listed on the National Stock Exchange and Bombay Stock Exchange on 1 September 2009. The government of India and State Governments have 74.51% share as a promoter of the Company while remaining 25.49% is public shareholding.

Market value
At present, NHPC is a schedule 'A' Enterprise of the Govt. of India with an authorised share capital of ₹150 billion, with an investment base of over ₹552 billion Approx. In 2015–16 NHPC made a profit after tax of ₹24.40 billion . An increase of 15% than the previous year profit of ₹21.24 billion. NHPC is among the top 10 companies in India in terms of investment.

Initially, on incorporation, NHPC took over the execution of Salal Stage-I, Bairasiul and Loktak Hydro-electric Projects from Central Hydroelectric Projects Control Board. Since then, it has executed 22 hydro projects with an installed capacity of 6717 MW on ownership basis including projects taken up in a joint venture. One wind project of 50 MW has also been commissioned in Oct 2016. NHPC has also executed 5 projects with an installed capacity of 89.35 MW on turnkey basis. Two of these projects have been commissioned in neighbouring countries i.e. Nepal and Bhutan at a capacity of 14.1 &60 MW.

Ongoing Projects (As of Feb 2017)
Presently NHPC is engaged in the construction of 3 projects aggregating to a total capacity of 3130 MW. NHPC has planned to add 1702 MW during 12th Plan period of which 1372 MW has been completed. 5 projects of 4995 MW are awaiting clearances/Govt. approval for their implementation. Detailed Projects reports are being prepared for 3 projects of 1130 MW. Besides, 3 projects of 1230 MW are under development through its JV, Chenab Valley Power Projects Pvt. Ltd. in J&K.

In late 2016, NHPC commissioned a 50 MW wind Power Project in Jaisalmer, Rajasthan.

Since its inception in 1975, NHPC has grown to become one of the largest organisations in the field of hydropower development in the country. With its present capabilities, NHPC can undertake all activities from concept to commissioning of hydroelectric projects.

Power stations
Total – 7097 MW

*Joint Venture with Madhya Pradesh (M.P.) Government

Hydro Power Projects Under construction
Total – 4425 MW

*Under JV through Chenab Valley Power Projects (P) Limited, in Kishtwar District of J&K.

Scheduling and Dispatch
The Scheduling and dispatch of all the generating stations owned by National Hydro Power Corporation is done by the respective Regional Load Dispatch Centres which are the apex body to ensure the integrated operation of the power system grid in the respective region. All these load dispatch centres come under Power System Operation Corporation Limited (POSOCO).

Awards and recognition
 Winner at Dun & Bradstreet-Everest Infra Awards 2015 in the Power Generation (Renewable Energy) category recognising its performance under the category.
'Gold Shield' for the year 2013–14 in the category of 'Early Completion of Hydro Power Projects' for Unit −3 (15 MW) of its Nimoo Bazgo Hydro Electric Project, Jammu & Kashmir, at a function held in Vigyan Bhawan, New Delhi on 3 June 2015.
 "CBIP Award for Best Performing Utility in Power Sector" at CBIP Awards on CBIP Day on 1 January 2015 in New Delhi.
 "Most Valuable PSU under Mini Ratna Category" at the India Today Group PSU Awards on 21 August 2014 in New Delhi.
 "Most Eco-Friendly Award" and "Most Valuable Company Award" in the Mini Ratna Category at the second India Today Group PSU Awards held on 14 December 2015.
 "Best Performing Utility in Hydro Power Sector" at the CBIP Award held at New Delhi on 29 December 2015.
 "Award for excellence in cost management" held at New Delhi on 28 May 2016. The award – instituted by The Institute of Cost Accountants of India – recognises NHPC's efforts in implementing effective cost management practices.
 "Best Hydropower Enterprise Award" by Hydropower Forum of India under the aegis of Enertia Foundation and Renewable Energy Promotion Association at the 2nd India Hydro Awards 2016 held at New Delhi on 10 June 2016.
 "Best Mini Ratna" at Dun & Bradstreet PSU Awards 2016.
 Awarded Second Prize by Ministry of Home Affairs, Govt. of India for the year 2015–16 under "Rajbhasha Kirti Puruskar" scheme for commendable work in the implementation of Rajbhasha amongst Public Sector Undertakings located in Region 'A'.
 NHPC has been conferred with CBIP Awards 2020 for “Outstanding performing utility in hydro power sector” on 19.02.2020.

References

External links
 

Electric-generation companies of India
Faridabad
Hydroelectricity in India
Energy companies established in 1975
Indian companies established in 1975
1975 establishments in Haryana
Companies based in Haryana
Companies listed on the National Stock Exchange of India
Companies listed on the Bombay Stock Exchange